Tom Maher (born 4 September 1952 in Melbourne, Victoria) is an Australian basketball coach, who is the most successful coach in Women's National Basketball League history, having won nine WNBL titles. He coached Nunawading Spectres to six titles, Perth, Canberra and Bulleen to one apiece (A tenth eluded him when in 2001 he had to leave his role as Sydney coach to take up a position in the WNBA. He had Sydney in first place when he left late in the season and it continued on to win the championship with Karen Dalton at the helm.). Carrie Graf, who won seven championships, one with Sydney and six with Canberra, and Jan Stirling who led Adelaide to four titles, are the next most successful WNBL coaches.

Maher was WNBL Coach of the Year in 1987 and 1992, and is a Life Member of the WNBL.

Maher led the Australia women's national basketball team to their first Olympic medal (bronze) in 1996 and then on to silver at the 2000 Summer Olympics in Sydney. He was head coach of New Zealand in Athens 2004, and coached the Tall Ferns to their best-ever performance of eighth. He coached the China women's national basketball team at the Beijing Olympics in 2008, finishing fourth.

In May 2009 he was appointed coach of the Great Britain women's team, replacing Mark Clark.  He coached Great Britain at the 2012 Summer Olympics, finishing eleventh. Maher returned as the head coach of the Chinese national team again for the 2016 Summer Olympics, which marks his sixth consecutive Olympic Games as a national head coach. The team finished tenth overall.

Coaching career 
 1993–2000 Head Coach, Australia women's national basketball team;
 2001 Head Coach, Washington Mystics, WNBA;
 2002–2003 Head Coach, Canberra Women's Basketball Association;
 2004 Head Coach, New Zealand women's national basketball team;
 2006–2008 Head Coach, China women's national basketball team;
 2009–2012 Head Coach, Great Britain women's national basketball team;
 2013–2016 Head Coach, China women's national basketball team.

Coaching achievements 
 Australia women's national basketball team:
 1994 World Championship – 4th;
 1996 Olympic Games – 3rd;
 1998 World Championship – 3rd;
 2000 Olympic Games – 2nd.
 New Zealand women's national basketball team:
 2004 Olympic Games – 8th.
 China women's national basketball team:
 2005 Asian Championship – 1st;
 2006 World Championship – 12th;
 2006 Asian Games – 1st;
 2008 Olympic Games – 4th;
 2013 Asian Championship – 3rd;
 2014 World Championship – 6th;
 2014 Asian Games – 2nd;
 2015 Asian Championship – 2nd;
 2016 Olympic Games – 10th.
 Great Britain women's national basketball team:
 2012 Olympic Games – 11th.

Personal life 
Maher is married to former Australia women's national basketball team captain Robyn Maher.

References 

1952 births
Living people
Australian men's basketball coaches
Australian Olympic coaches
Australian women's basketball coaches
British Olympic coaches
Sportspeople from Melbourne
Washington Mystics head coaches
FIBA Hall of Fame inductees